Timi Melei is a Tuvaluan politician and Cabinet Minister.

Melei worked as an officer of the Tuvalu Police Force. He did not attend secondary school as a teenager, but returned at age eighteen to learn English. He later studied at Victoria University of Wellington in new Zealand, graduating in 2016 with a Masters in Criminology. He was elected to the Parliament of Tuvalu at the 2019 Tuvaluan general election, and appointed Minister for Education, Youth & Sports in the cabinet of Kausea Natano.

References

Living people
Victoria University of Wellington alumni
Members of the Parliament of Tuvalu
Education ministers of Tuvalu
Year of birth missing (living people)